The Bestune B70S is a fastback compact SUV produced by Bestune.

Overview
The Bestune B70S was revealed during the 2021 Guangzhou Auto Show and was launched in China right after in the first quarter of 2022 with prices ranging from 109,900 to 142,900 yuan (16,350 – US$21,260).

The interior of the B70S features a 12.3-inch digital instrument cluster, a 12.3-inch infotainment touchscreen, and another 7-inch touchscreen for the climate controls. The seats come standard with leather and Alcantara upholstery, and the 3D holographic virtual assistant first offered on the Bestune T77 is also equipped on the B70S.

Specifications
The Bestune B70S is available as a five-seater vehicle, and is powered by a 170 hp 1.5-litre turbo engine mated to a 7-speed DCT and a 224 hp 2.0-litre turbo engine mated to a 6-speed automated manual gearbox. Both variants are offered in front-wheel drive only.

References

External links

Official website

Compact sport utility vehicles
Crossover sport utility vehicles
Cars of China
Cars introduced in 2021